Kalateh-ye Hajj Rahmat (also Romanized as Kalāteh-ye Ḩājj Raḩmat; also known as Kalāteh-ye Ḩājj ʿAlī Āḵbar) is a village in Tabar Rural District, Jolgeh Shoqan District, Jajrom County, North Khorasan Province, Iran. At the 2006 census, its population was 70, in 23 families.

References 

Populated places in Jajrom County